This is a list of the etymology of street names in the London district of Southwark (also called Borough). The area has no formally defined boundaries – those utilised here are: the river Thames to the north, Tower Bridge Road to the east, Bricklayers Arms/New Kent Road/Elephant and Castle to the south, and London Road/St George's Circus/Blackfriars Road to the west.

A
 Abbey Street – after Bermondsey Abbey, formerly located here
 Alderney Mews 
 Alice Street
 America Street
 Angel Place – formerly Angel Alley, both after a former inn here of this name
 Arch Street 
 Archie Street
 Avon Place
 Avonmouth Street – unknown; formerly Devonshire Street
 Ayres Street – after Alice Ayres, local resident who died whilst saving the lives of three children in a house fire in 1885

B
 Baden Place
 Bank End and Bankside – both after former earthen banks built to protect against the Thames
 Barnham Street
 Bartholomew Street – after a former hospital located near here run by St Bartholomew's Hospital
 Bath Terrace 
 Battle Bridge Lane – after medieval landowners the abbots of Battle
 Bear Gardens and Bear Lane – both after the sport of bear baiting formerly practised here
 Becket Street – after Thomas Becket, murdered Archbishop of Canterbury, by association with the pilgrims who went this way to Canterbury
 Bedale Street – after Bedale, Yorkshire; it was formerly York Street after Prince Frederick, Duke of York and Albany but was changed in 1891 to avoid confusion with similarly named streets; further back still it was Foul Lane, a descriptive epithet
 Bedford Row
 Bell Yard Mews
 Belvedere Buildings and Belvedere Place
 Bermondsey Square and Bermondsey Street – understood to mean 'Beornmund's island'; but, while "Beornmund" represents an Old English personal name, identifying an individual once associated with the place, the element "-ey" represents Old English "eg", for "island", "piece of firm land in a fen", or simply a "place by a stream or river". Thus Bermondsey need not have been an island as such in the Anglo-Saxon period, and is as likely to have been a higher, drier spot in an otherwise marshy area.
 Bickels Yard 
 Bittern Street
 Blackfriars Road – named after Blackfriars Bridge in 1769/70; it was formerly Great Surrey Street, reflecting the traditional county it is in
 Black Horse Court – after a former inn here of this name
 Black Swan Yard – after a former inn here of this name
 Blue Lion Place
 Borough High Street, Borough Road and Borough Square – after the ancient Borough of Southwark
 Bowling Green Place – after an 18th-century bowling green located here
 Boyfield Street – after Josiah Boyfield, local landowner and clothmaker
 Braidwood Street – after 19th century fireman James Braidwood
 Brew Wharf Yard
 Bricklayers Arms – after a former coaching inn here of this name 
 Bridge Yard – presumably with reference to the nearby London Bridge
 Brinton Walk
 Brockham Street – unknown; formerly Church Street
 Brunswick Court
 Burbage Close – after Richard Burbage, noted Shakespearian actor
 Burge Street 
 Burrell Street
 Bursar Street – after William Waynflete, Bishop of Winchester in the 15th century; he left an endowment of local property to the College

C
 Caleb Street
 Calvert's Buildings – after Felix Calvert, 18th century brewer here
 Canvey Street – after Canvey Island in Essex; it was formerly Essex Street
 Cardinal Bourne Street – after Francis Bourne, Bishop of Southwark in the late 19th century
 Cardinal Cap Alley – after a former inn or brothel here, called either the Cardinal's Cap or Hat
 Carmarthen Place 
 Castle Yard – after a former inn here of this name
 Cathedral Street – after the adjacent Southwark Cathedral
 Chaloner Court
 Chancel Street
 Chapel Court 
 Chettle Close 
 City Walk
 Clennam Street
 Clink Street – after The Clink prison formerly located here
 Cluny Place – after Bermondsey Abbey, initially established as a Cluniac order
 Coach House Mews
 Cole Street
 Collinson Street and Collinson Walk – after the Collinson family, noted for their active interest in local and church affairs in the 19th century
 Collinwood Street
 Copperfield Street – after the novel David Copperfield by Charles Dickens, by association with Dickens Square
 Cottons Lane
 Counter Street – corruption of compter (small prison), as the borough's compter formerly stood here
 County Street
 Crosby Court and Crosby Row
 Crucifix Lane – after the former Cross of Bermondsey located here; it was destroyed in 1559

D
 Davidge Street 
 Decima Street 
 Deverell Street
 Dickens Square – after Charles Dickens, who spent part of his childhood here
 Disney Place and Disney Street 
 Dolben Street – after John Dolben, 17th century archbishop; it was formerly George Street
 Dorrit Street and Little Dorrit Court – after the novel Little Dorrit by Charles Dickens, by association with Dickens Square
 Doyce Street
 Druid Street – possibly after a former inn here with ‘Druid’ in its name
 Duchess Walk
 Duke Street Hill – named for Arthur Wellesley, 1st Duke of Wellington, 19th century military figure
 Dunsterville Way

E
 Elephant and Castle – derived from a coaching inn of this name
 Elim Street
 Emerson Street – after Thomas Emerson, 15th century local benefactor
 English Grounds – thought to be after the English workers here during the railway boom, who were kept separate from the Irish ones nearby at Irish Grounds
 Ewer Lane

F
 Fair Street – after the former Horselydown Fair held here
 Falmouth Road
 Farnham Place
 Fenning Street
 Flatriron Square and Flatiron Yard

G
 Gaitskell Way
 Gambia Street – unknown; formerly William Street
 Gatehouse Square
 Gaunt Street
 George Inn Yard – after the adjacent George Inn
 Gibbon's Rents
 Glasshill Street – after the former glassworks located here; formerly just Hill Street
 Globe Street – after the former inn here of this name, possibly named for the Globe Theatre
 Great Dover Street – as this formed part of the traditional London to Dover road
 Great Guildford Street – after Suffolk House, owned by Lady Jane Guildford in the early Tudor period; possibly also in allusion to Guildford, county town of Surrey
 Great Maze Pond – after the Medieval Maze Manor here, named for a prominent maze in its grounds
 Great Suffolk Street – after Suffolk House, home to Charles Brandon, 1st Duke of Suffolk in the Tudor period
 Great Yard 
 Green Dragon Court – after a Tudor-era inn here of this name
 Green Walk
 Grotto Court – after Thomas Finch's Grotto Grounds, 18th century pleasure grounds located near here
 Guildable Bridge Street – the term ‘Guildable’ is first recorded in 1377, refers to the collection of taxes there and was adopted to distinguish this from the other manors of the Southwark area
 Guinness Court
 Guy Street – after Thomas Guy, founder of Guy's Hospital

H
 Haddon Hall Street – after Haddon Hall, local religious mission named for Charles Haddon Spurgeon, noted Victorian-era preacher
 Hamlet Way
 Hankey Place – after Donald Hankey, prominent member of the local Edwardian-era charitable organisation the Oxford and Bermondsey Club
 Hardwidge Street – after James Hardwidge, local 18th century needlemaker and church benefactor
 Harper Road – unknown; it was changed from Union Road to avoid confusion with similarly named streets, and before that it was Horsemonger Lane, after the local horse dealers
 Hatchers Mews
 Hay's Lane – after the Hays family, who owned nearby Hay's Wharf
 Holland Street – after a former manor house here called Holland's Leaguer, possibly named from its owner's family name
 Holyrood Street – after the former Rood (cross) of Bermondsey located here; it was destroyed in 1559
 Hopton Street and Hopton's Gardens – after Charles Hopton, who funded the local almshouses here in the 18th century
 Horsemongers Mews – probably by association with the nearby Horsemongers Lane (now Harper Road)
 Hulme Place
 Hunter Close

I
 Invicta Plaza
 Issac Way

J
 Joiner Street
 Jubilee Walkway – named in 1977 to commemorate the Silver Jubilee of Queen Elizabeth II

K
 Kell Street
 Kentish Buildings – after 17th century property owner Thomas Kentish; formerly it was Christopher Alley, after an inn of this name named in 1977 to commemorate the Silver Jubilee of Queen Elizabeth II
 Keppel Row – after Augustus Keppel, 1st Viscount Keppel, 18th century naval figure
 Keyworth Place and Keyworth Street – after Leonard James Keyworth, recipient of a Victoria Cross in the First World War
 King James Court and King James Street 
 King's Bench Street – after the King's Bench Prison formerly located here
 King's Court
 King's Head Yard – after a former inn here of this name
 King's Place
 Kipling Street
 Kirby Grove

L
 Lamb Walk – after a 17th-century inn here of this nam
 Lancaster Street – unknown; formerly Union Street
 Lansdowne Place
 Lant Street – named after Thomas Lane, local 17th century landowner
 Lavington Street – after Thomas Lant, local 18th century developer
 Law Street
 Leathermarket Court and Leathermarket Street – after the tanneries and leather market formerly located here
 Leigh Hunt Street – after the author Leigh Hunt, who served a short sentence in a nearby prison
 Library Street
 Lockyer Street 
 Loman Street – after the former Loman's Pond located here
 London Bridge Street and London Bridge Walk – after the adjacent London Bridge
 London Road
 Long Lane – presumably simply descriptive

M
 McCoid Way 
 Magdalen Street – after either William Waynflete, Bishop of Winchester in the 15th century, who attended Magdalen College, Oxford, or a 13th-century church here called St Mary Magdalen
 Maiden Lane
 Maidstone Buildings Mews
 Manciple Street – after the character of the manciple in Geoffrey Chaucer's Canterbury Tales, by reference to the adjacent Pilgrimage Street
 Market Yard Mews
 Marshalsea Road – after the former Marshalsea Prison here
 Meadow Row
 Melior Place and Melior Street – after Melior May Weston, local 18th century property owner
 Mermaid Court – after a former inn here of this name
 Mermaid Row
 Merrick Square – after local 17th century landowner Christopher Merrick
 Middle Road
 Middle Yard
 Milcote Street
 Mint Street – after a Tudor-era royal mint located here
 Montague Close – after Montague House formerly located here, named for Anthony Browne, 1st Viscount Montagu
 More London
 Morgan's Lane 
 Morocco Street – named for the local Morocco leather industry
 Mulvaney Way

N
 Nebraska Street
 Nelson Square – after Admiral Horatio Nelson
 Newcomen Street – after the local Newcomen Charity, named for its 17th century founder; it was formerly King Street, after a local inn of this name
 New Globe Walk – after the Globe Theatre
 Newham's Row 
 Newington Causeway and Newington Court – Newington is a now almost obsolete name for the Elephant and Castle area; it means ‘new village/farmstead’ and dates to the early Middle Ages
 New Kent Road – as this formed the traditional route down to Kent; the ‘New’ section dates from 1751, and is an extension of the Old Kent Road
 Nicholson Street

O
 O’Meara Street – after Daniel O’Meara, priest at St George's Cathedral, Southwark
 Ontario Street
 Oxford Drive

P
 Pardoner Street – after the character of the pardoner in Geoffrey Chaucer's Canterbury Tales, by reference to the adjacent Pilgrimage Street
 Park Street – after a former park here attached to Winchester House
 Pepper Street
 Perkins Square
 Pickford Lane
 Pickwick Street – after the novel The Pickwick Papers by Charles Dickens, by association with Dickens Square
 Pilgrimage Street – as this formed part of the ancient pilgrimage route to Canterbury
 Plantain Place
 Playhouse Court 
 Pocock Street – after the locally prominent Pocock family
 Porlock Street
 Porter Street
 Potier Street
 Potters Fields – so called as it was previously a burial ground - a potter’s field - for unknown, unclaimed or indignant people.  Coincidentally, there was also Roman pottery found near here
 Price's Street – after a local builder of this name
 Prioress Street – after the character of the prioress in Geoffrey Chaucer's Canterbury Tales, by reference to the adjacent Pilgrimage Street

Q
 Queen Elizabeth Street
 Queen's Head Yard – after a former grammar school here named for Queen Elizabeth I
 The Queen's Walk – named in the 1977 to commemorate the Silver Jubilee of Queen Elizabeth II 
 Quilp Street – after Daniel Quilp, a character in the novel The Old Curiosity Shop by Charles Dickens, by association with Dickens Square

R
 Railway Approach – descriptive, after the adjacent London Bridge station
 Redcross Way – after either the Redcross burial ground formerly located here or an inn of this name
 Rephidim Street
 Risborough Street
 Robinson Road
 Rochester Walk – after a former house here owned by the bishops of Rochester
 Rockingham Street
 Roper Lane
 Rose Alley – after the Tudor-era Rose Theatre
 Rotary Street
 Rotherham Walk
 Rothsay Street
 Royal Oak Yard
 Rushworth Street – after 17th century politician John Rushworth, who was imprisoned for a period at the nearby King's Bench Prison

S
 St George's Circus – as this area was formerly called St George's Fields, after St George the Martyr, Southwark church; the circus opened in 1770
 St Margaret's Court – named for the former St Margaret's church here; it was for a period known as Fishmonger's Alley, as it belonged to the Worshipful Company of Fishmongers
 St Olaf Stairs – probably for the former St Olave's grammar school located here 
 St Thomas Street – after St Thomas’ Hospital, formerly located here
 Sanctuary Street – as the local mint formerly here claimed the local area as a sanctuary for debtors
 Sawyer Street – after Bob Sawyer, a character in the novel The Pickwick Papers by Charles Dickens, by association with Dickens Square
 Scoresby Street – unknown; formerly York Street
 Scovell Crescent and Scovell Road – after the Scovells, local business family
 Shand Street – after Augustus Shand, member of local Board of Works in the late 19th century; it was formerly College Street, by association with the nearby Magdalen Street
 Shipwright Yard 
 Silex Street
 Silvester Street
 Snowfields 
 Southall Place
 Southwark Bridge Road and Southwark Street – the name Suthriganaweorc or Suthringa geweorche is recorded for the area in the 10th-century Anglo-Saxon document known as the Burghal Hidage and means "fort of the men of Surrey" or "the defensive work of the men of Surrey". Southwark is recorded in the 1086 Domesday Book as Sudweca. The name means "southern defensive work" and is formed from the Old English sūth and weorc. The southern location is in reference to the City of London to the north, Southwark being at the southern end of London Bridge
 Sparrick's Row 
 Spurgeon Street – after Charles Spurgeon, noted Victorian-era preacher
 Stainer Street – after John Stainer, prominent Victorian-era organist
 Staple Street 
 Sterry Street – after the Sterry family, local business owners in the 18th-19th centuries
 Still Walk
 Stonemasons Court
 Stones End Street – as this marked the pointed where the paved surface of Borough High Street ended in former times
 Stoney Street – formerly Stony Lane, both simply descriptive names
 Sturge Street
 Sudrey Street
 Sumner Buildings and Sumner Street – after Charles Sumner, Bishop of Winchester in the 19th century
 Surrey Row – after the traditional county here of Surrey
 Swan Street – after a former inn here of this name

T
 Tabard Street – after a former inn here of this name
 Talbot Yard – a corruption of the Tabard Inn, as above
 Tanner Street – after the tanneries formerly located here; it was formerly Five Foot Lane, after its narrow dimension
 Tarn Street
 Tay Court
 Tennis Street – after tennis courts formerly located here
 Theobald Street 
 Thomas Doyle Street – after Thomas Doyle, a key figure in the building of St George's Cathedral, Southwark
 Thrale Street – after the Thrale family, who owned a brewery here in the 17th century
 Tiverton Street
 Tooley Street – corruption of St Olave's Church, Southwark, which formerly stood here
 Toulmin Street – after the Toulmin family, prominent figures in local business and church affairs
 Tower Bridge Road – as it leads to Tower Bridge
 Trinity Church Square and Trinity Street – after Trinity Church here
 Trio Place
 Trundle Street
 Tyers Gate

U
 Union Street – thought to be as it linked two other streets

V
 Vine Lane – thought to be after a former vineyard here
 Vine Yard – thought to be after a former inn here called the Bunch of Grapes
 Vinegar Yard – after the vinegar distilleries formerly located here

W
 Wallis Alley
 Wardens Grove
 Weavers Lane – probably after weavers formerly working from here
 Webber Street
 Weller Street – after Sam Weller, a character in the novel The Pickwick Papers by Charles Dickens, by association with Dickens Square
 Weston Street – after local 19th century property owner John Weston
 White Hart Yard – after a former inn here of this name
 Whites Grounds
 Wild's Rents
 Winchester Square and Winchester Walk – after Winchester House, formerly the London house of the Bishop of Winchester

X
...

Y
...

Z
 Zoar Street – after the former Zoar Chapel here, named for the Biblical Zoara

References
Citations

Sources

Streets in the London Borough of Southwark
Street names of London
London Borough of Southwark
Lists of United Kingdom placename etymology
England geography-related lists